Coleophora sequens is a moth of the family Coleophoridae. It is found in China and Mongolia.

References

sequens
Moths of Asia
Moths described in 1979